The 2020 Women's Euro Winners Cup was the fifth edition of the Women's Euro Winners Cup (WEWC), an annual continental beach soccer tournament for women's top-division European clubs. The championship is the sport's version of the UEFA Women's Champions League in association football.

Organised by Beach Soccer Worldwide (BSWW), the tournament was held in Nazaré, Portugal, in tandem with the larger men's edition.

The competition was supposed to take place from late May to early June. However, on 1 May, all BSWW tournaments were suspended until September because of safety concerns surrounding the COVID-19 pandemic. BSWW rescheduled the competition for 9–13 September. However, due to persisting travel restrictions and health worries deterring clubs from travelling, the pandemic caused the competition to happen on a much smaller scale this year than in recent, with just five clubs entering.

The competition was played in a round robin format, involving one group of all five teams. At its conclusion, the team with the most points was crowned champions.

AIS Playas de San Javier of Spain were the defending champions, but chose not to enter because of the COVID-19 pandemic. Ukrainian side Mriya 2006 won the competition on their debut, finishing ahead of Cáceres based on their head-to-head result after both clubs finished with the same points.

Teams

Qualification
Initially, entry requirements were as last year. To enter, a club needed to be the champions of their country's most recent national championship.

But due to the effect of the COVID-19 pandemic on the competition, many eligible clubs were unable/did not want to participate due to travel restrictions and quarantine measures upon their repatriation.

Thus, the original rules regarding qualification were subsequently abandoned. Entry restrictions were relaxed: the event was opened up to simply any European club that wished to participate.

Entrants
Five clubs from five different nations entered the event:

 Cáceres
 Marseille
 Mriya 2006
 Newteam Brussels
 Zvezda

Venues

Two venues were used in one host city: Nazaré, Leiria District, Portugal. 

Matches took place at Praia de Nazaré (Nazaré Beach) on one of two pitches. The Estádio do Viveiro (Viveiro Stadium) and an external purpose made pitch, located adjacent to the main stadium, simply known as Pitch 2.

Squads
Each club could submit a squad consisting of a maximum of 12 players. A maximum of four foreign players were allowed to be part of the squad, however only three of the four could be outfield players; if a fourth foreign player was to be rostered they must be a goalkeeper.

Results
All times are local, WEST (UTC+1).

Awards
The following individual awards were presented after the final.

Top goalscorers
Players who scored multiple goals

6 goals
 Annaelle Wiard ( Newteam Brussels)

5 goals

 Anna Cherniakova ( Zvezda)
 Mariia Tykhonova ( Mriya 2006)
 Natalia Kanaeva ( Zvezda)
 María Herrero ( Cáceres)

4 goals

 Tiphanie Pradier ( Marseille)

3 goals

 Ania Davydenko ( Mriya 2006)
 Glafira Bazhanova ( Zvezda)

2 goals

 Yuliia Kostiuk ( Mriya 2006)
 Taisiia Babenko ( Mriya 2006)
 Sara Garcia ( Marseille)
 Maria Becerra ( Cáceres)
 Yanma Damache ( Marseille)

Source:

See also
2020 Euro Winners Cup

References

External links
Women's Euro Winners Cup Nazaré 2020, at Beach Soccer Worldwide
Women's Euro Winners Cup 2020, at ZeroZero.pt

Women's Euro Winners Cup
2020 in beach soccer
Euro
2020
Nazaré, Portugal
Euro Winners Cup